Saint-Laurent-sur-Oust (literally Saint-Laurent on Oust) is a commune in the Morbihan department of Brittany in north-western France. Inhabitants of Saint-Laurent-sur-Oust are called in French Laurentins.

See also
Communes of the Morbihan department

References

External links

 Mayors of Morbihan Association 

Saintlaurentsuroust